The Alara block is a Magic: The Gathering expert-level expansion block, consisting of the expansion sets Shards of Alara (October 3, 2008), Conflux (February 6, 2009) and Alara Reborn (April 30, 2009).  The Alara block focuses on multicolored cards, in particular cards with three or more colors.

Shards of Alara

Set details
Bill Rose was the lead designer for Shards of Alara, and Devin Low was its lead developer. Shards is a multicolor set which revolves around three-color combinations. Its tagline is, "Five worlds share one fate." The set consists of 249 cards, of which 20 are basic lands, 101 are common, 60 uncommon, 53 rare, and 15 mythic rare. It was the first set to contain cards of the mythic rarity.

The design of Shards of Alara focuses on five different "shards" which originally formed a single world. Mechanically, each shard consists of one of the five magic colors and its two allied colors. Each shard has its own keyword mechanic or strong overarching theme, and its own creature types. The five shards were designed separately by three person design teams.

Shards of Alara introduced several changes in Wizards' design and publishing approach. Shards and later sets have a smaller number of cards, to reduce the size of the card pool for Block and Standard constructed tournament formats. A new level of rarity, "Mythic Rare", was added; mythic rares replace a booster pack's rare card in 1 out of 8 packs. Also, as part of a move to make products more friendly to beginners, booster packs include a basic land in place of one of the commons, and pre-constructed decks will be rebranded as "Intro Packs" including a 41-card preconstructed deck and one booster pack. There were design changes to the fat pack, which for Shards of Alara includes five distinct box arts and the replacement of the usual set novel with an excerpt from A Planeswalker's Guide to Alara. Shards was the last set for which tournament packs were released.  These changes held for Conflux and Alara Reborn.

Shards of Alara also brings new planeswalker cards to the game. The first multicolored planeswalker to be revealed publicly was the red and green .

Story
The plane of Alara, once rich with mana, was torn apart by an unknown planeswalker. The world survived, but it was split into five distinct shards. Each of the shards lacks two of the five colors of mana, which influenced their development and created different environments.

Mechanics
Shards of Alara introduced the mechanics of devour, exalted and unearth.

Conflux

Story
The storyline focuses on the chaos which results from the Shards being forced together in a ring, constantly raking against one another. Esper finds itself clashing with Grixis and Bant, Bant is wedged between Esper and Naya, Naya finds its way between Bant and Jund, Jund conflicts with Grixis and Naya, and Grixis is pressed between Esper and Jund.

Mechanics
Conflux continues the Shards of Alara set's multicolor theme, expanding on it by introducing five-colored cards to the Alara block. Conflux is the set with the highest number of five-colored cards of all Magic sets. Aside from the multicolored theme, the set makes use of the mechanics introduced in Shards of Alara,
Exalted, Unearth, and Devour. Conflux also introduced Domain, an ability word which refers to an effect involving the number of basic land types among lands the player controls (this had been used in Invasion, but not as a keyword).  Conflux expands on the existing mechanics of cycling and protection in the form of basic landcycling and protection from everything.

Alara Reborn

Set details
Alara Reborn is the first set in the history of Magic: The Gathering to consist entirely of multicolored, or "gold", cards (cards which require mana of more than one color to play). It expands on the mechanics, themes and flavor established in Shards of Alara and Conflux, but creates new combinations of creatures under the influence of more than one shard, such as coloured artifact creatures from Esper that have the Bant ability Exalted.

Mechanics
Alara Reborn continues on the Shards of Alara set's Exalted, Unearth and Devour mechanics, as well as the Shadowmoor and Ravnica blocks' Hybrid Mechanic. Cards using the Hybrid Mechanic in this set lack the usual hybrid card border colors as they include a third color outside of the hybrid colors. It has also brought about the new mechanic called Cascade, which reflects the chaotic, magical nature of the Maelstrom(a huge mana-storm that has gathered about the centre of the now-reborn Alara) in altering the nature of otherwise normal spells. When you play a spell with cascade, exile cards from the top of your library until you remove a nonland card that costs less. You may cast it without paying its mana cost. Put the removed cards on the bottom in a random order. This mechanic effectively means that when you cast a spell with the "Cascade" keyword, you get to cast at least one other "free" spell directly from your library.

Reception
Shards of Alara won the 2009 Origins Award as "Best Collectible Card Game or Expansion".

Notable cards
Notable cards from Shards of Alara include  and 

Notable cards from Conflux include ,  and 

Notable cards from Alara Reborn include  and

References

External links 
 Official product page
 Shards of Alara Spoilers
 Official Conflux product page
 Conflux Spoiler list
 Official product page
 Visual spoiler

Magic: The Gathering blocks